Aston Cantlow Parochial Church Council v Wallbank [2003] UKHL 37 is a UK constitutional law case, concerning judicial review.

Facts

In the vast majority of ecclesiastical parishes (into which all of England and Wales is split) chancel repair liability is not applicable.  However, in 2003, in a particularly lightly populated glebe, Andrew and Gail Wallbank received a demand for almost £100,000 to fund repairs of their parish's medieval church at Aston Cantlow in Warwickshire. 
Mr. and Mrs. Wallbank and other ‘lay rectors’ claimed they were not liable to pay costs to repair their parish church, and that this would be a violation of their right to property enshrined in the European Convention on Human Rights (ECHR), Protocol 1, Article 1. The public authority was a parochial church council of the Church of England. After a protracted legal battle, the Law Lords found in favour of the parochial church council, leaving the Wallbanks with a £350,000 bill including legal costs.

Judgment
The House of Lords held the Aston Cantlow parochial church council was not a core public authority under the ECHR and its case law on religious bodies. The parochial church council was not a hybrid public authority either, but the issue had to be dealt with on a case-by-case basis. The council was seeking to enforce a duty to pay for church repairs, and this was effectively a ‘civil debt’, and so a private, not a public obligation.

Lord Nicholls said this:

Lord Hope said this:

See also
Chancel repair liability
United Kingdom constitutional law

References

United Kingdom constitutional case law